Eduardo "Eddie" Rivera Gullas Sr. (born October 13, 1930) is a Filipino politician from Cebu, Philippines. The son of Vicente Gullas and Pining Rivera, he has been elected to five terms as a Member of the House of Representatives of the Philippines, representing the 1st District of Cebu from 1992 to 2001, and from 2004 to 2013. He is currently a member of Nacionalista and the One Cebu party. Gullas had also served as the governor of Cebu during the administration of President Ferdinand Marcos. Gullas also served as the president of the University of the Visayas. He had also held the offices of Deputy Speaker of the House of Representatives and the House Majority Leader. He served mayor of Talisay City, Cebu from 2016 to 2019. He is among the 70 congressman who voted to deny the ABS-CBN franchise.

References

1930 births
Living people
Governors of Cebu
Kabalikat ng Malayang Pilipino politicians
One Cebu politicians
Nacionalista Party politicians
Members of the House of Representatives of the Philippines from Cebu
Majority leaders of the House of Representatives of the Philippines
Deputy Speakers of the House of Representatives of the Philippines
University of the Visayas alumni
Mayors of Talisay, Cebu